Larry Doke is a Canadian provincial politician, who served as the Member of the Legislative Assembly of Saskatchewan for the riding of Cut Knife-Turtleford from 2011 to 2020 as a member of the Saskatchewan Party. He was first elected in the 2011 election, and subsequently re-elected in the 2016 election. He did not run for re-election in the 2020 election.

Electoral results

2016 Saskatchewan general election

2011 Saskatchewan general election

Cabinet positions

References

Living people
Saskatchewan Party MLAs
Year of birth missing (living people)
21st-century Canadian politicians